The 33rd Senate district of Wisconsin is one of 33 districts in the Wisconsin State Senate.  Located in southeastern Wisconsin, the district comprises most of central Waukesha County.  It includes the cities of Waukesha and Delafield.

Current elected officials
Chris Kapenga is the senator representing the 33rd district.  He was first elected to the Senate in a 2015 special election.  Before becoming a state senator, he was a member of the Wisconsin State Assembly from 2011 through 2015.

Each Wisconsin State Senate district is composed of three State Assembly districts.  The 33rd Senate district comprises the 97th, 98th, and 99th Assembly districts.  The current representatives of those districts are:
 Assembly District 97: Scott Allen (R–Waukesha)
 Assembly District 98: Adam Neylon (R–Pewaukee)
 Assembly District 99: Cindi Duchow (R–Delafield)

The district crosses two congressional districts.  The city of Waukesha and the northern half of Waukesha County fall within Wisconsin's 5th congressional district, which is represented by U.S. Representative Scott L. Fitzgerald; the part of the district in the southern half of Waukesha County falls within Wisconsin's 1st congressional district, represented by U.S. Representative Bryan Steil.

Past senators
Previous senators include:

Note: the boundaries of districts have changed repeatedly over history. Previous politicians of a specific numbered district have represented a completely different geographic area, due to redistricting.

References

External links
District Website

Wisconsin State Senate districts
Waukesha County, Wisconsin
1861 establishments in Wisconsin